Dickerson is a surname. Notable people with the surname include:

Alex Dickerson (born 1990), American baseball player
Bobby Dickerson (born 1965), American baseball coach
Chris Dickerson (baseball) (born 1982), American baseball player
Chris Dickerson (bodybuilder) (1939–2021), American bodybuilder
Corey Dickerson (born 1989), American baseball player
Dan Dickerson (born 1958), American sportscaster
Debra Dickerson (born 1959), American writer and author
Denver Dickerson (1914–1981), Speaker of the Nevada Assembly and Secretary of Guam
Denver S. Dickerson (1872–1925), Governor of Nevada and Superintendent of Federal Prisons
Eric Dickerson (born 1960), NFL Hall of Fame running back
Ernest Dickerson (born 1951), American film director
Fanny Dickerson Bergen (1846 – 1924), an American folklorist, ethnobiologist and author
Garrett Dickerson (born 1995), American football player
George Dickerson (disambiguation), multiple people
John Dickerson (disambiguation), multiple people
Landon Dickerson (born 1998), American football player
Richard Dickerson (1904) black man lynched in Ohio
Mahala Ashley Dickerson (1912–2007), American lawyer and civil rights advocate for women and minorities
Mahlon Dickerson (1770–1853), American politician
Marianne Dickerson (1960–2015), American long-distance runner
Mary Dickerson (disambiguation), multiple people
Mary Augusta Dickerson (1876-1962), American author
Mary Cynthia Dickerson (1866–1923), American herpetologist
Mary H. Dickerson (1830-1914), American businesswoman and clubwoman
Mary Lou Dickerson (born 1946), American politician
Matt Dickerson (born 1995), American football player
Michael Dickerson (born 1975), American basketball player
Nancy Dickerson (1927–1997), American broadcast journalist
Noah Dickerson (born 1997), American basketball player
Oliver Morton Dickerson (1875–1966), American academic
Richard Dickerson was an American politician and law enforcement officer
Richard E. Dickerson (born 1931) is an American biochemist.
Robert Dickerson (1924–2015), Australian artist
Travis Dickerson, American musician and record producer
Tyler Dickerson (born 1993), American country music singer
Walt Dickerson (1928–2008), American jazz vibraphonist
William Worth Dickerson (1851–1923), United States Representative from Kentucky